The Australian Capital Territory as of 2014 contains 46 separate protected areas with a total land area of  or 55.5% of the territory's area, and which managed by Territory and Municipal Services of the ACT government:

Protected areas of the Australian Capital Territory

Botanic gardens
Australian National Botanic Gardens

National parks
 Namadgi

Nature Reserves

As of 2015, 33 of these nature reserves have been grouped together under the name Canberra Nature Park.

 Aranda Bushland
 Black Mountain
 Bruce Ridge
 Bullen Range
 Callum Brae
 Cooleman Ridge
 Crace
 Dunlop Grassland
 Farrer Ridge
 Gigerline
 Goorooyarroo
 Gossan Hill
 Gungaderra Grassland
 Isaacs Ridge
 Jarramlee Grassland Reserve
 Jerrabomberra Wetlands
 Justice Robert Hope Park
 Kinleyside
 Kowen Escarpment
 McQuoids Hill
 Melrose
 Molonglo Gorge
 Molonglo River
 Mount Ainslie
 Mount Majura
 Mount Mugga Mugga
 Mount Painter
 Mount Pleasant
 Mount Taylor
 Mulanggari Grassland
 Mulligans Flat Woodland Sanctuary
 O'Connor Ridge
 Oakey Hill
 Old Naas TSR
 Percival Hill
 Red Hill
 Rob Roy
 Stony Creek
 Swamp Creek
 The Pinnacle
 Tidbinbilla
 Tuggeranong Hill
 unnamed 
 Urambi Hills
 Wanniassa Hills
 West Jerrabomberra
 Woodstock

Wilderness zone
 Bimberi

See also
 Protected areas of Australia
Australian Alps National Parks and Reserves

References

External links
Australian Capital Territory Parks and Conservation official webpage

 
Protected areas
Lists of protected areas of Australia